The 1927 Harvard Crimson football team represented Harvard University as an independent during the 1927 college football season. In its second season under head coach Arnold Horween, Harvard compiled a 4–4 record and was outscored by a total of 108 to 85. Charles A. Pratt Jr. was the team captain. The team played its home games at Harvard Stadium in Boston.

Schedule

References

Harvard
Harvard Crimson football seasons
Harvard Crimson football
1920s in Boston